The 2022–23 Ardal SW season (also known as the 2022–23 Floodlighting and Electrical Services Ardal SW season for sponsorship reasons) is the second season of the new third-tier southern region football in Welsh football pyramid, part of the Ardal Leagues.

Teams
The league was made up of 16 teams competing for one automatic promotion place to Cymru South, whilst the second place team qualified for a play-off with the second-placed team of Ardal SE. Three teams are relegated to Tier 4.

Team changes

To Ardal SW
Promoted from South Wales Alliance League Premier Division
 Baglan Dragons
 Cefn Cribwr

Promoted from West Wales Premier League
 Mumbles Rangers
 Seven Sisters Onllwyn

Relegated from Cymru South
 Port Talbot Town

From Ardal SW
Promoted to Cymru South
 Pontardawe Town
 Ynyshir Albions

Relegated
 Ton Pentre
 West End
 AFC Porth

Stadia and locations

Source: Ardal SW Ground Information

 (Cefn Cribwr are ground sharing at Cambrian & Clydach Vale, whilst Mumbles Rangers share at Swansea University)

League table

Results

References

External links
Football Association of Wales
Ardal Southern Leagues
Ardal Southern Twitter Page
Tier 3 Rules & Regulations

3
Ardal Leagues
Wales